Hiding Out is a 1987 American comedy-drama film starring Jon Cryer as a state's witness who disguises himself as a high school student in order to avoid being killed by the mob.

Plot
Revealed shortly into the movie, Andrew Morenski and two others, all stockbrokers, have passed bogus bonds for a mobster awaiting trial. After an evening out at a bar, one of them is killed in his home. The next morning, the FBI take the other two into protective custody.

Convincing his FBI bodyguards to have breakfast out of the safe house, Andrew and the agents are followed by hitmen. One of the bodyguards is killed in the diner, the other injured, and Andrew flees the scene. While running from the hitmen, he boards a train, temporarily escaping. Andrew hitchhikes with a truck driver to Topsail, Delaware, where he phones his Aunt Lucy, who tells him to meet her at the high school where she is the nurse.

Shaving his beard and bleaching the sides of his hair blonde give Andrew a punk look. He trades his $500 Italian sports coat for a peacoat from a bum to complete the look. Arriving at Topsail High School, the office personnel, mistake him for a new student and register him for classes. He takes the name of Maxwell Hauser (off a Maxwell House coffee can).

Andrew's cousin does not recognize him at first. He eventually pulls him aside, revealing himself. He also sleeps at Patrick's, unbeknownst to his aunt.

Not willing to take the teachers' attitudes, Andrew becomes a hero to those tired of the school's status quo. This upsets Kevin O'Roarke, the current class president, and captures the heart of Ryan Campbell. During an afternoon at the local diner, he accidentally drops a birthday card meant for his grandmother (who had raised him) and it gets mailed. Later, a hitman posing as an FBI agent contacts his grandmother and sees the card and its postmark, telling him where Andrew is hiding.

One night, back from a date with Ryan, Patrick stops Andrew from entering the house. FBI agents have arrived, knowing he is close because he used his ATM card. Patrick takes his mother's keys and Andrew ends up using the high school as his refuge. He meets the school janitor, Ezzard, and shares a drink with him, revealing who he is. Andrew embraces the opportunity to run for class president, not knowing the election committee has already decided to rig the results in favor of Kevin.

Bored with high school, and realising he is the last witness against the mobster, Andrew decides to drop out. During the presentation of class election results, Kevin is announced the winner. However, he demands a recount, which reveals that most want Andrew as class president. As Andrew starts to address the crowd, a hitman begins firing at the stage. Ezzard, watching the proceedings, manages to dispose of one of the hitmen, while the other moves up into the rafters of the gym. Andrew chases him and Patrick uses a spotlight to blind the hitman, who loses his grip and falls to the gym floor below.

Images of graduation are spliced into images of Andrew taking the stand in court against the mobster for whom he had sold the bogus bonds. After his testimony, Andrew is given a few minutes to say farewell to his grandmother before being placed in the Witness Protection Program.

The last scene is of Ryan, sitting under a tree at a university. Andrew, now known as Eddie Collins, appears from behind the tree and tells her he has decided to become a teacher.

Cast
Jon Cryer as Andrew Morenski/Maxwell Hauser
Keith Coogan as Patrick Morenski
Annabeth Gish as Ryan Campbell
 Claude Brooks as Clinton
Oliver Cotton as Killer
Tim Quill as Kevin O'Roarke
Tony Soper as Ahern
Ned Eisenberg as Rodriguez
Marita Geraghty as Janie Rooney
John Spencer as Bakey
Gretchen Cryer as Lucy Morenski
Anne Pitoniak as Grandma Jennie
Beth Ehlers as Chloe
Richard Portnow as Mr. Lessig
Gerry Bamman as Mr. Stevens
Jack Gilpin as Dr. Gusick 
Joy Behar as Gertrude
Lou Walker as Ezzard

Soundtrack
Four songs from the film's soundtrack entered the record charts in the United States: "Crying" by Roy Orbison (re-recorded as a duet with k.d. lang); "Live My Life" by Boy George; "Catch Me (I'm Falling)" by Pretty Poison, which went top ten in the US and also topped the Billboard Hot Dance Club Play chart in September 1987; and the top-20 U.S. hit "You Don't Know" by Scarlett and Black. The UK hit "Seattle" by Public Image Ltd. was also recorded in 1987 and featured in the film.

Reception
Roger Ebert compared the film to Like Father, Like Son, also released in 1987, in that it was an "example of the newest Hollywood genre, the Generation Squeeze, in which plots artificially combine adult and teenage elements" in order to attract the latter to the movie theater while attracting enough of an adult audience for the success of the rental market.  Ebert describes as "dumb" the main plot device involving the gangsters' continuing pursuit of Andrew, and the story arc about the janitor he befriends, and notes that the film fails to depict how the 29-year-old protagonist could have much in common with Gish's character, who is more than 10 years younger than he is. He credited the film with getting him to wonder what it would be like to revisit one's high school years, but cites Peggy Sue Got Married from 1986 as a film that had portrayed that scenario much more successfully.

Janet Maslin called the film "pleasant enough" with "mild" jokes that "revolve around things such as Mr. Cryer's accidentally giving tax advice to the father of a teenage girl he's dating, or his feeling out of place at the roller rink." She thought the film's conclusion suggested that Cryer "could have unexpected charm in more adult roles."

The Time Out Film Guide called the film "predictable, slackly plotted nonsense, marginally redeemed by a genial young cast."

References

External links
 
 
 
 

1987 films
1980s teen comedy-drama films
1987 independent films
American independent films
American teen comedy-drama films
Films about organized crime in the United States
Films shot in Massachusetts
Films shot in North Carolina
De Laurentiis Entertainment Group films
Films scored by Anne Dudley
Films set in Delaware
1987 directorial debut films
1987 comedy films
1987 drama films
1980s English-language films
Films directed by Bob Giraldi
1980s American films